The Amazing James Brown is the fourth studio album by American musician James Brown and The Famous Flames. The album was released in 1961, by King Records.

Track listing
All songs written by James Brown, unless noted otherwise.

References

1961 albums
James Brown albums
The Famous Flames albums
Albums produced by James Brown
King Records (United States) albums